Avril M. Joy is a British author whose short story "Millie and Bird" won the Costa Short Story Award in the 2012 Costa Book Awards.

Born in Somerset, Joy graduated with a BA in History of Art from the University of East Anglia in 1972. A short story writer and poet, her debut novel The Sweet Track was published in 2007.

References

External links
www.avriljoy.com

Year of birth missing (living people)
Living people
Alumni of the University of East Anglia
Costa Book Award winners
British writers